State Road 95 (NM 95) is a state highway in the US state of New Mexico. NM 95's western terminus is a continuation as County Road 322, and the eastern terminus is at U.S. Route 64/U.S. Route 84 (US 64/US 84) north of Tierra Amarilla.

Major intersections

See also

References

095
Transportation in Rio Arriba County, New Mexico